Helen Broneau (born Helen Ingram) was an American actress and screenwriter who was active in Hollywood during the silent era. After a brief union with Charles Bronaugh (the source of her stage name, albeit with an altered spelling), she married Australian actor Frank Baker in 1929; the pair remained together until her death in 1972.

Selected filmography

As actress 

 A Romeo of the Range (1928)
 The Winking Idol (1926)
 Secret Service Sanders (1925)
 Scar Hanan (1925)
 The Desert Hawk (1924)
 Western Yesterdays (1924)
 The Hunchback of Notre Dame (1923)
 Merry-Go-Round (1923)
 Crossed Wires (1923)
 The Radio King (1922)
 The Punctured Prince (1922)
 All Dolled Up (1921)
 The Triflers (1920)

As screenwriter 

 O.U.T. West (1925)

References 

American silent film actresses
20th-century American actresses
Actors from Missouri
1894 births
1972 deaths